The Israeli Standards Institute's Standard SI 960 defines a 7-bit Hebrew code page. It is derived from, but does not conform to, ISO/IEC 646; more specifically, it follows ASCII except for the lowercase letters and backtick (`), which are replaced by the naturally ordered Hebrew alphabet. It is also known as DEC Hebrew (7-bit), because DEC standardized this character set before it became an international standard. Kermit named it hebrew-7 and HEBREW-7.

The Hebrew alphabet is mapped to positions 0x60–0x7A, on top of the lowercase Latin letters (and grave accent for aleph). 7-bit Hebrew is stored in visual order.

This mapping with the high bit set, i.e. with the Hebrew letters in 0xE0–0xFA, is also reflected in ISO 8859-8.

Code page layout

See also 
ISO/IEC 646
DEC National Replacement Character Set (NRCS)
SI 1311

References 

Character sets
SII standards